Ramzan Siddique Bhatti is a Pakistani politician who was a Member of the Provincial Assembly of the Punjab, from 2008 to May 2018 and from August 2018 to January 2023.

Early life and education
He was born on 2 June 1976 in Lahore.

He has a Bachelor of Arts degree which he obtained in 1995 from Forman Christian College.

Political career
He was elected to the Provincial Assembly of the Punjab as a candidate of Pakistan Muslim League (N) (PML-N) from Constituency PP-153 (Lahore-XVII) in 2008 Pakistani general election. He received 24,391 votes and defeated Zulfiqar Ali Badar, a candidate of Pakistan Peoples Party (PPP).

He was re-elected to the Provincial Assembly of the Punjab as a candidate of PML-N from Constituency PP-153 (Lahore-XVII) in 2013 Pakistani general election.

In December 2013, he was appointed as Parliamentary Secretary for local government.

He was re-elected to Provincial Assembly of the Punjab as a candidate of PML-N from Constituency PP-166 (Lahore-XXIII) in 2018 Pakistani general election.

References

Living people
Punjab MPAs 2013–2018
Punjab MPAs 2008–2013
1976 births
Pakistan Muslim League (N) MPAs (Punjab)
Punjab MPAs 2018–2023